Filip Grabovac or Filip Grahovac (1697/8 – 13 February 1749) was a Croatian Franciscan priest, professor, patriot, poet and writer.

Grabovac was born in a village near Podosoje, Vrlika. His schooling was at the Franciscan monastery in Brist. In 1719, he completed his novitiate. After becoming a priest, he spent some years as a lecturer. Then, for twenty years or more he served as a military chaplain of the Venetian army. He had come to reside in Verona but his duty included frequent travels in northern Italy, especially Venice. This work was tough on him, and he suffered great bouts of ill health. His salary, which was the same as that of a soldier, didn't make things better, for he had to look after his horse from that same income. It was due to such diligent work and sacrifices that he became renowned in Verona and by 1747 was one of the province's most revered priests. In 1747, he published a few books in Venice.

But Grabovac soon faced attacks from several people in Venice, presumably because of his books. Grabovac was arrested in Verona and brought to Venice, where he was put in prison. There he fell seriously ill, and was transferred first to a nearby monastery and then to the island of Santo Spirito. Soon afterwards, Grabovac succumbed to his illness and died.

Although the government burned copies of his books wherever they found them, six copies of his work somehow survived. Of the six, only two remained in their entirety. In 1951, the Croatian Academy of Sciences and Arts published an edition of Grabovac's works.

References

1698 births
1749 deaths
18th-century Croatian Roman Catholic priests
18th-century Croatian poets
Croatian male poets
18th-century male writers
Croatian Franciscans